The 2008 Canadian Senior Curling Championships were held March 22-30 at the Prince Albert Golf and Curling Club in Prince Albert, Saskatchewan. The winning teams represented Canada at the 2009 World Senior Curling Championships.

Team Saskatchewan, consisting of Eugene Hritzuk, Kevin Kalthoff, Verne Anderson and Dave Folk won the men's event, defeating New Brunswick's Russ Howard rink in the final.

Men's standings

Playoffs

Women's

Teams

Standings

Results

Draw 1

Draw 2

Draw 3

Draw 4

Draw 5

Draw 6

Draw 7

Draw 8

Draw 9

Draw 10

Draw 11

Draw 12

Draw 13

Draw 14

Draw 15

Draw 16

Draw 17

Draw 18

Draw 19

Draw 20

Draw 21

Draw 22

Playoffs

Semifinal

Final

References

External links
Official site - Internet archive

2008
Senior Curling Championships
Sport in Prince Albert, Saskatchewan
Curling in Saskatchewan
Canadian Senior Curling
March 2008 sports events in Canada